FC SOYUZ-Gazprom Izhevsk was a Russian association football club from Izhevsk, founded in 1988 and playing on the professional level since 1991. In 2010, it played in the Russian Second Division. It played in the Russian First Division in 1993 and from 1996 to 2004, taking 4th place in 1996. Before 2011 season SOYUZ-Gazprom was dissolved and a new team FC Zenit-Izhevsk Izhevsk started representing the city in the Russian Second Division.

Team name history
1988-1993 FC Gazovik Izhevsk
1994-2005 FC Gazovik-Gazprom Izhevsk
2006–2010 FC SOYUZ-Gazprom Izhevsk

External links
Club History information

Defunct football clubs in Russia
Football clubs in Izhevsk
Gazprom
Association football clubs established in 1988
Association football clubs disestablished in 2010
1988 establishments in Russia
2010 disestablishments in Russia